Bablusha is a 2016 Indian Kannada film directed by Venkat Bharadwaj. It stars Harsh Arjun, Shamanth Shetty , Mrudhula Bhaskar, and Baby Shamaa, with Avinash, Shobraj, Raj Kamal, Paramesh, Srikanth Heblikar, Shantala Bhandi, and Lawrence Pritam as supporting cast.

Bablusha is a historical family thriller. It is based on a true story involving a family in Mallinathapura in the year 1501.

Cast
 Harsh Arjun
 Shamanth Shetty as Bablusha 
 Mrudhula Bhaskar
 Baby Shamaa
 Paramesh
 Avinash
 Shobraj
 Raj Kamal
 Srikanth Heblikar 
 Shantala Bhandi
 Shantakumari
 Sriharsha Neergundha

Production
After the success of A Day in the City, Bharadwaj was approached by the NRI to come up with a historical film. Venkat accepted the opportunity and created Bablusha. Venkat selected three of the 480 candidates who auditioned for the lead role. The film was shot within 24 days.

Soundtrack

References

External References 
 The Hindu Article on Bablusha
 Deccan Chronicle-Mrudhula Basker in Bablusha

{{|date=June 2019 |bot=InternetArchiveBot |fix-attempted=yes }}

2010s Kannada-language films
2016 films
Indian epic films
Indian historical romance films